Jena Engstrom  (born Liana Jeanne Moon) is an American former television actress. Born June 30, 1942, in Los Angeles, California. She appeared in more than three dozen episodes of various television series between 1960 and 1964.

Career
Jena Engstrom began acting after graduating from high school  and first appeared on television in the 1960 episode "Adopted" of the ABC crime drama, The Detectives Starring Robert Taylor. She appeared in 37 television programs before making her final appearance opposite guest star Robert Culp in the 1964 episode, "The Stallion", of NBC's The Virginian.  She played a girl who had a crush on Steve Douglas in an October 19, 1961 episode of My Three Sons.

Mother and daughter

Jena Engstrom is the daughter of actress Jean Engstrom whose television career (1955-1966)  overlapped her daughter's and whose career also included movie and regional stage appearances.    Most on-line databases and this article have listed only two of the three TV shows in which they appeared together.

The first of the two shows listed is the April 1961 episode of the CBS program Rawhide titled "Incident of the Lost Idol" in which they appeared as mother and daughter.  They had only one brief scene together as the story was not about their relationship.

The second show listed is the January 1962 episode "To Sell Another Human Being" of ABC's The New Breed, starring Leslie Nielsen, in which mother Jean played a wealthy woman who with her husband (played by Richard Arlen) adopt a baby through an adoption mill.  The police get involved when the baby's natural mother, played by daughter Jena, tries to get her baby back.

The third television show in which they appeared together is an unidentified 30-minute religious program presented in 1961 in which they played mother and daughter.  In this story a girl (Jena) has trouble relating to her parents until a session with teenagers at a church is recorded and the recording made available to the parents to listen to.  Appearing in this show with Jean and Jena Engstrom are Robert Stevenson as Jena's father and Richard Evans as her boyfriend.  This film, minus the opening and closing credits, has been posted on-line.

Western series

Twenty-one of Engstrom's thirty-seven roles were in television westerns. She appeared three times each on Have Gun, Will Travel, and Wagon Train, as well as Rawhide, twice each on Bonanza, Gunsmoke, and Laramie, and once each on The Tall Man, Death Valley Days, Frontier Circus, and Outlaws, as well as her final performance as an actress in The Virginian.

In "The Education of Sarah Jane" episode of Have Gun, Will Travel, Engstrom appeared as Sarah Jane. In the "Milly" episode of Gunsmoke, she played Milly Glover. In the episode "Chester’s Indian", Engstrom plays Callie Dill. In 1962, in one of her three appearances on Rawhide, she had the title role of "The Child-Woman" in an episode. In 1961, she portrayed Laurie Manson in "The Incident of the Lost Idol". She retired from acting in 1964, not long after appearing  on Wagon Train and in an episode of Perry Mason in which  she plays Vera Janel in "The Case of the Illicit Illusion".  Her final television appearance was on The Virginian in an episode broadcast in September 1964, "The Black Stallion".

Illness

Engstrom left acting in 1964, possibly because of health considerations. In 1963, she was cast in what was to have been a recurring role of Jennie in the series The Travels of Jaimie McPheeters, starring Kurt Russell, but had to give up the role because of illness and was replaced by Donna Anderson.

In June 1964, she was replaced again because of ill health by Davey Davison in the episode "Children of Calamity" of Richard Crenna's CBS drama series, Slattery's People.

Confused credits

The acting credits of mother Jean and daughter Jena were confused at the time they were active in the business resulting in mixed credits in newspapers and problems with pay checks. For a long time the credits were confused on many Internet databases, and while some errors still exist, many have been corrected.

DVDs

Several of the television series listed below have been released by their studios on DVDs that are available for sale or for rent.

Television Roles   

Note:  "Episode" column:  2.9 indicates Season 2, Episode 9, etc.

References

External links 

 

Living people
American television actresses
Actresses from Los Angeles
20th-century American actresses
21st-century American women
Year of birth missing (living people)